Events from the year 1988 in France.

Incumbents
 President: François Mitterrand 
 Prime Minister: Jacques Chirac (until 10 May), Michel Rocard (starting 10 May)

Events
 29 March – African National Congress representative Dulcie September assassinated in Paris.
 22 April–5 May – The Ouvéa cave hostage taking takes place in Ouvéa, Loyalty Islands, New Caledonia.
 24 April – Presidential Election held.
 8 May – Presidential Election held, won by François Mitterrand.
 5 June – Legislative Election held.
 12 June – Legislative Election held.
 26 June – Air France Flight 296 Airbus A320 crashes at an airshow at Mulhouse killing three passengers.
 26 June – Matignon Accords referendum held.
 27 June – Gare de Lyon train accident results in 56 deaths.
 21 July – Renault launches the R19 hatchback range, which replaces the Renault 11 hatchback. A saloon model to replace the Renault 9 is expected soon.
 August – Construction begins on the Euro Disney resort and theme park east of Paris; it is expected to be open within three years.
 26 August – Mehran Karimi Nasseri, "The terminal man", is stuck in Charles de Gaulle Airport in Paris, where he will continue to reside until 1 August 2006.
 25 September – Cantonales Elections held.
 2 October – Cantonales Elections held.
 28 October – Abortion: 48 hours after announcing it was abandoning RU-486, French manufacturer Roussel Uclaf states that it would resume distribution of the drug, bowing to pressure from the Government of France.

Births

January to March
 5 January – Pauline, singer and songwriter.
 16 January – Benoît Richaud, ice dancer.
 25 January – Tatiana Golovin, tennis player.
 7 February – Albin Hodža, footballer
 12 February – Guillaume Borne, soccer player.
 24 February 
Mathieu Baudry, footballer
Rodrigue Beaubois, basketball player
 27 February – Sandy Paillot, soccer player.
 5 March – Damien Plessis, soccer player.
 10 March – Kévin Olimpa, soccer player.
 27 March – Quentin Othon, soccer player.
 28 March – Mélodie Chataigner, pair skater.
 31 March – Mickael Charvet, soccer player.

April to June
 21 April – Ibrahima Traoré, soccer player.
 4 May – Simon Pontdemé, soccer player.
 18 May – Paul Baysse, soccer player.
 12 June – Matthias Lepiller, soccer player.
 29 June – Adrian Mannarino, tennis player

July to September
 4 July – Angélique Boyer, actress.
 11 July – Étienne Capoue, soccer player.
 14 July – Jérémy Stravius, swimmer
 8 August – Flavia Bujor, novelist.
 16 August – Christophe Pourcel, motocross rider.
 18 August – Wilfried Domoraud, soccer player.
 19 August – Kévin Monnet-Paquet, soccer player.
 25 August – Malaury Martin, soccer player.
 31 August – Rachel Legrain-Trapani, Miss France in 2007.
 6 September – Jean-Yves Mvoto, soccer player.
 16 September – Kim Lucine, figure skater.

October to December
 12 December – Kévin Bru, soccer player.
 14 December – Nicolas Batum, basketball player.
 15 December – Floyd Ayité, soccer player.

Deaths

January to March
 9 January – Thierry Maulnier, journalist, essayist, dramatist and literary critic (born 1909).
 20 January – Philippe de Rothschild, motor racing driver, scriptwriter, film producer, poet and wine grower (born 1902).
 2 February
 Alain Savary, politician and Minister (born 1918).
 René Massigli, diplomat (born 1888).
 16 February – Charles Delaunay, author, jazz expert, co-founder and long-term leader of the Hot club de France (born 1911).
 19 February – René Char, poet (born 1907).
 19 February – André Frédéric Cournand, physician and physiologist, shared Nobel Prize in Physiology or Medicine in 1956 (born 1895).
 6 March – Jeanne Aubert, singer and actress (born 1906).
 19 March – Francis Lefebvre, physician (born 1916).
 21 March – Germain Jousse, member of the French Resistance (born 1895).
 30 March – Edgar Faure, politician, essayist, historian, and memoirist (born 1908).
 31 March – Georges Lévis, comic artist (born 1924).

April to June
 14 April – Daniel Guérin, anarchist and author (born 1904).
 18 April – Pierre Desproges, humorist (born 1939).
 24 May – Ernest Labrousse, historian (born 1895).
 24 June – Pierre Jaïs, bridge player (born 1913).

July to September
 15 July – Armand Mouyal, epee fencer (born 1925).
 31 July – André Navarra, cellist and cello teacher (born 1911).
 1 August – Louis-Jean Guyot, Cardinal (born 1907).
 11 August
 Pauline Lafont, actress (born 1963).
 Jean-Pierre Ponnelle, opera director (born 1932).
 20 August – Jean-Paul Aron, writer and journalist (born 1925).
 25 August – Françoise Dolto, physician and psychoanalyst (born 1908).

October to December
 14 October – René Vietto, cyclist (born 1914).
 23 October – André Neher, Jewish scholar and philosopher (born 1914).
 10 November – Jean Leray, mathematician (born 1906)
 11 November – Émile Muller, politician (born 1915).
 4 December – Fernand Mourlot, printer and publisher (born 1895).
 13 December – André Jaunet, flautist (born 1911).
 29 December – Émile Aillaud, architect (born 1902).

Full date unknown
 Serge Mouille, industrial designer and goldsmith (born 1922).
 Jules Semler-Collery, composer, conductor and teacher (born 1902).

References

Links

1980s in France